Sonny Hilton (born 30 January 2001) is an English professional footballer who plays for Fulham, as a midfielder.

Career
Hilton began his career with Tranmere Rovers and Fulham, before spending time on loan with Finnish club TPS in 2021. In June 2022 he moved on loan to Carlisle United.

Personal life
Hilton also competes in taekwondo, and finished fourth in the World Championships as a child.

Career statistics

References

2001 births
Living people
English footballers
Tranmere Rovers F.C. players
Fulham F.C. players
Turun Palloseura footballers
Carlisle United F.C. players
Ykkönen players
English Football League players
Association football midfielders
English expatriate footballers
English expatriate sportspeople in Finland
Expatriate footballers in Finland